Supa  or Supe is a village in Parner taluka in Ahmednagar district of state of Maharashtra, India.

Demographics
The majority of the population in the village is Hindu. There are also sizeable minorities Muslims, and Christians in the village. In recent decades, there has been the migration of people from Uttar Pradesh, Madhya Pradesh, and Odisha. The migrants find employment in construction and the factories on MIDC industrial park. 

In recent years Supa have become one metro village as it contains people from many locations. Availability of Jobs increasing population in Supa.

It is growing as industrial hub.

Education

School
 Zilla Parishad Marathi School
 New English School, Supa

Colleges 
 Junior College of Arts and Science
 Samarth Polytechnic College 
 Divate Patil Public School
 MET English Medium School 
Agri Diploma College
 New Arts Commers And Science College, Parner

Computer Institute 
 Hi-Tech Computer Institute (Best Computer Training Institute )
 
Pragati Computers

See also
 Parner taluka
 Villages in Parner taluka

References 

Villages in Parner taluka
Villages in Ahmednagar district